

Events

March
 March 25 – The first railway passenger service begins, on the Oystermouth Railway in South Wales. The cars are drawn by horses.

May
 May - closure of the Low Moor Waggonway

Births

January births 
 January 9 – Matthias von Schönerer, Austrian railway engineer (d. 1881).

March births 
 March 27 – James P. Kirkwood, designer of Starrucca Viaduct in the United States (d. 1877).

November births 
 November 5 – Oliver Ames Jr., president of Union Pacific Railroad 1866–1871, brother of Oakes Ames (d. 1877).

December births 
 December 16 – William H. Aspinwall, American financier who helped build the Panama Railway (d. 1875).

Deaths

References